Persea borbonia or redbay is a small, evergreen tree in the laurel family (Lauraceae), native to the southeastern United States. It belongs to the genus Persea, a group of evergreen trees including bays and the avocado. Persea borbonia has several common names including tisswood, scrubbay, shorebay, and swampbay.

Description
Persea borbonia can be present as either a small tree or a large shrub. It has evergreen leaves that are about 3 to 6 inches long with a lance shape. The leaves are arranged alternately and emit a spicy smell when crushed. The leaves vary in color from bright green to dark green. 
These trees are capable of producing fruit that is a small, blue or black drupe.
Redbay is a perennial, with a non-herbaceous stem that is lignified.

Distribution
Persea borbonia grows in the coastal margins of the southeastern United States. It is endemic to the lowlands of Texas, Arkansas, Louisiana, Florida, Mississippi, Alabama, Georgia, South Carolina, and eastern North Carolina. Small, isolated populations can be found in coastal Virginia, and near the Maryland and Delaware state line. It also grows in the Bahamas and is cultivated in Hawaii. It usually grows on the borders of swamp land.

Due to an invasion of redbay ambrosia beetle in the Southern United States the tree is slowly dying out. The beetle was discovered in 2002 near Savannah, Georgia and it carries a laurel wilt fungal disease that is responsible for killing redbays. However, foresters agree the species will likely not go extinct in the southeastern U.S. since it appears to rejuvenate to some degree on its own.

Uses
The plant is not widely used now for medicinal purposes, however members of the Seminole tribe formerly used it as an emetic to induce vomiting. The dried-up leaves can be used as a condiment.

The wood is hard and strong and can be used to build boats, cabinets and for lining the interior of structures.  The wood is not traded on a large scale so it is confined to the regions where P. borbonia grows.

Cultivation
Persea borbonia is cultivated as an ornamental tree for gardens and parks.

Wildlife
Deer and bears also eat the leaves and fruits of redbay. Birds, including turkey, eat the plant's bitter fruit.

Research
Persea borbonia has been the subject of research into grafting and hybridization with the avocado (Persea americana) for potential benefits of disease resistance and tolerance to damp soil and cold temperatures.  The two are not known to hybridize and may hybridize rarely if at all; and grafting research has determined two compatibility groups for americana and borbonia with no viable interstem species between them.

References

External links

borbonia
Flora of the Southeastern United States
Flora of Texas
Medicinal plants
Plants used in traditional Native American medicine
Garden plants of North America
Trees of the Southeastern United States